Eutropoflavin (4'-Dimethylamino-7,8-dihydroxyflavone) is a synthetic flavone and selective small-molecule agonist of TrkB, the main receptor of brain-derived neurotrophic factor (BDNF), which was derived from structural modification of tropoflavin (7,8-DHF). Relative to tropoflavin, eutropoflavin possesses higher agonistic activity at TrkB, is significantly more potent than tropoflavin both in vitro and in vivo, and has a longer duration of action (peaking at 4 hours and "partially decaying" at 8~16 hours in rodents). The compound has been found to produce neuroprotective and neurogenic effects in the brain and spinal cord as well as antidepressant-like effects in animals.

See also 
 Tropomyosin receptor kinase B § Agonists

References 

Antidepressants
Flavones
Neuroprotective agents
Nootropics
TrkB agonists